East West Players is an Asian American theatre organization in Los Angeles, founded in 1965. As the nation's first professional Asian American theatre organization, East West Players continues to produce works and educational programs that give voice to the Asian Pacific American experience today.

Overview
Established in 1965 by Mako, Rae Creevey, Beulah Quo, Soon-tek Oh, James Hong, Pat Li, June Kim, Guy Lee, and Yet Lock as a place where Asian-American actors could perform roles beyond the stereotypical caricatures they were being limited to in Hollywood. An early statement of purpose read: "To further cultural understanding between the East and West by employing the dual Oriental and American heritages of the East-West Players."

Current mission statement: 
As the nation's premier Asian American theatre organization, East West Players produces artistic works and educational programs that foster dialogue exploring Asian Pacific experiences.

Current vision statement:
 Continuing the movement to develop, foster and expand Asian Pacific performance into a major force on the national arts scene in the 21st century
 National recognition of the organization's productions and programs
 Increased opportunities for Asian and Pacific Islander artists on stage and in other media
 Introducing audiences to the diverse Asian Pacific experiences
 Educational programs and mentorship in the literary, technical and performing arts
 Financial and organizational sustainability and growth

East West Players has been called “the nation’s pre-eminent Asian American theater troupe” for their award-winning productions blending Eastern and Western movement, costumes, language, and music. EWP has premiered over 100 plays and musicals about the Asian Pacific American experience and has facilitated over 1,000 readings and workshops. Its emphasis is on building bridges between East and West; attendance estimates are 56% Asians and 44% non-Asians.

In 1998, EWP Producing Artistic Director Tim Dang led the company’s move from a 99-seat Equity Waiver "black box” into a new 240-seat venue at an Actors' Equity Association contract level. EWP’s mainstage is the David Henry Hwang Theater, housed within the historic Union Center for the Arts in downtown Los Angeles’ Little Tokyo district. The theater serves over 15,000 people each year, including low income audiences of whom are provided free and discounted admissions as well as deaf audiences via ASL-interpreted productions.

EWP hosts an annual awards dinner to celebrate the achievements of individuals who have "raised the visibility of the Asian Pacific American (APA) community through their craft."

Educational programs
EWP offers a growing array of educational programs training over 200 multicultural artists each year – the Actors Conservatory (performance workshops and an intensive Summer Conservatory); David Henry Hwang Writers Institute; the career program, Alliance of Creative Talent Services (ACTS); and the touring Theatre for Youth (reaching an estimated 50,000 K-8th graders and their families via in-school performances and festivals). Scholarships have been offered for these programs in the past to maintain accessibility for students.

Alumni
Notable EWP alumni include actors Mako, Nobu McCarthy, Pat Morita, James Hong, Yuki Shimoda, John Lone, Rodney Kageyama, BD Wong, James Saito, Freda Foh Shen, Lauren Tom, Amy Hill, Alec Mapa, Alan Muraoka, Emily Kuroda, Sala Iwamatsu, Chris Tashima, Anthony Begonia, John Cho, Kal Penn, Daniel Dae Kim, Matthew Yang King, Parvesh Cheena, James Kyson-Lee, Masi Oka, Francois Chau, Jeanne Sakata, Rachna Khatau, Greg Watanabe, Dante Basco, and dramatists Wakako Yamauchi, Hiroshi Kashiwagi, David Henry Hwang, Philip Kan Gotanda, Roberta Uno, R.A. Shiomi, Judith Nihei and Soji Kashiwagi. East West Players has also had the opportunity to work with many respected artists and faculty such as actors Dennis Dun, Danny Glover, Bill Macy, Takayo Fischer, George Takei, Tsai Chin, and Nancy Kwan, directors, Lisa Peterson and Oskar Eustis, musician Dan Kuramoto and instructors Calvin Remsberg and Fran Bennett.

Over seventy-five percent of all Asian Pacific performers in the acting unions living in Los Angeles have worked at EWP. East West Players has provided training and opportunities to many emerging and professional artists who have gone on to win Tony Awards, Obie Awards, Emmy Awards, LA Stage Alliance Ovation Awards, and Academy Awards.

East West Players has collaborated with many organizations though its history, including Center Theatre Group, Robey Theatre Company, Cornerstone Theater Company, Ma-Yi Theatre Company, and Cedar Grove OnStage.

Honorees 
EWP hosts an annual gala fundraiser in order to honor "individuals [as well as corporations and foundations] who have raised the visibility of the Asian Pacific American (APA) community through their craft." There are five awards: the Visionary Award, Corporate/Foundation Visionary Award, Made in American Award, Breakout Performance Award, and the Founders Award. Past honorees include Tia Carrere, John Cho, Tim Dang, Prince Gomolvilas, Amy Hill, Mako, Mike Shinoda, and BD Wong.

The event itself comprises a formal dinner followed by a silent auction. Proceeds from the event go directly toward funding the theatre's many educational and artistic programs.

Current season

2020 - 2021 55th Season

Previous seasons

References

External links

facebook.com/EWPlayers on Facebook
twitter.com/EWPlayers on Twitter
instagram.com/eastwestplayers on Instagram
East West Players on MySpace

Asian-American organizations
Asian-American theatre
Theatre companies in Los Angeles
Drama schools in the United States
1965 establishments in California
Organizations based in Los Angeles
Arts organizations established in 1965
Little Tokyo, Los Angeles
Theatre company production histories